John Lyttelton may refer to:

 John Lyttelton, 9th Viscount Cobham (1881–1949), British politician
 John Lyttelton (MP) (1561–1601), English politician
 John Lyttelton, 11th Viscount Cobham (1943–2006), British nobleman
 Sir John Lyttelton (1520–1590) (1519–1590), constable of Dudley Castle, England, keeper of parks, Custos Rotulorum of Worcestershire

John Littleton
Using an alternative spelling:
John Littleton (born 1957),  an American artist
John Littleton (sheriff), High Sheriff of Cornwall

See also
John Littleton Dawson (1813–1870), Democratic member of the U.S. House of Representatives from Pennsylvania